The 2013 Masters Grand Slam of Curling was held from October 29 to November 3 at the Abbotsford Entertainment & Sports Centre in Abbotsford, British Columbia as part of the 2013–14 World Curling Tour. The Masters was the first Grand Slam on the men's tour and the third Grand Slam on the women's tour. The purses for both the men's and the women's events were CAD$100,000 each.

The event featured the six men's and six women's teams that have qualified for the 2013 Canadian Olympic Curling Trials as well as teams representing most of the nations that have already qualified for the curling at the 2014 Winter Olympics, along with some nations that are attempting to qualify. Out of the 16 men's and women's teams that have already qualified for the Olympics, only Denmark failed to send a team in the women's event. Out of the teams that have not yet qualified for the Olympics, the United States and New Zealand sent men's teams, and China, Latvia and Japan sent women's teams.

Men
The teams are listed as follows:

Teams

Round Robin Standings
Final Round Robin Standings

Round Robin Results
All draw times are listed in Pacific Daylight Time (UTC−7).

Draw 1
Tuesday, October 29, 7:00 pm

Draw 2
Wednesday, October 30, 9:00 am

Draw 3
Wednesday, October 30, 12:30 pm

Draw 4
Wednesday, October 30, 4:30 pm

Draw 5
Wednesday, October 30, 7:30 pm

Draw 6
Thursday, October 31, 9:00 am

Draw 7
Thursday, October 31, 12:30 pm

Draw 8
Thursday, October 31, 4:30 pm

Draw 9
Thursday, October 31, 7:30 pm

Draw 10
Friday, November 1, 9:00 am

Draw 11
Friday, November 1, 12:30 pm

Draw 12
Friday, November 1, 4:30 pm

Tiebreakers
Friday, November 1, 7:30 pm

Playoffs
The playoffs draw is listed as follows:

Quarterfinals
Saturday, November 2, 9:00 am

Semifinals
Saturday, November 2, 4:00 pm

Final
Sunday, November 3, 10:00 am

Women

Teams
The teams are listed as follows:

Round Robin Standings
Final Round Robin Standings

Round Robin Results
All draw times are listed in Pacific Daylight Time (UTC−7).

Draw 1
Tuesday, October 29, 7:00 pm

Draw 2
Wednesday, October 30, 9:00 am

Draw 3
Wednesday, October 30, 12:30 pm

Draw 4
Wednesday, October 30, 4:30 pm

Draw 5
Wednesday, October 30, 7:30 pm

Draw 6
Thursday, October 31, 9:00 am

Draw 7
Thursday, October 31, 12:30 pm

Draw 8
Thursday, October 31, 4:30 pm

Draw 9
Thursday, October 31, 7:30 pm

Draw 10
Friday, November 1, 9:00 am

Draw 11
Friday, November 1, 12:30 pm

Draw 12
Friday, November 1, 4:30 pm

Playoffs
The playoffs draw is listed as follows:

Quarterfinals
Saturday, November 2, 12:30 pm

Semifinals
Saturday, November 2, 7:30 pm

Final
Sunday, November 3, 3:00 pm

References

External links

2013 in Canadian curling
Sport in Abbotsford, British Columbia
Curling competitions in British Columbia
2013 in British Columbia
Masters (curling)